John Scott Cummings (6 July 1943 – 4 January 2017) was a British Labour politician who served as Member of Parliament (MP) for Easington from 1987 until 2010.

Early life
Cummings was born in Newcastle upon Tyne, a fifth-generation coal miner. He was educated at the Murton Council Infant and Junior schools on Watt Street and Secondary school. He attended both the Easington Technical College and the Durham Technical College until 1962. He began his career with the National Coal Board as a miner in 1958, working as a pit electrician from 1967 until his election to the House of Commons twenty years later. He was elected as a councillor to the Easington District Council in 1970, was its chairman from 1975 to 1976, and was its leader from 1979 until he stepped down in 1987. Active on picket lines during the 1984–85 miners' strike, in which Easington was the location of several clashes with the police, Cummings later claimed his Jack Russell Terrier Grit had been trained to "nip at policemen's ankles".

He was a member of the Northumbrian Water Authority and the Peterlee and Newton Aycliffe Development Corporation. A trade unionist with the National Union of Mineworkers, he was a trustee for the union from 1986 to 2000.

Parliamentary career
Cummings was first elected to the House of Commons at the 1987 General Election as the Labour MP for Easington following the retirement of Jack Dormand. His majority was 24,639. Entering the Commons at the same time as another former miner from the North-East, Ronnie Campbell, the two men were described by journalist Andrew Roth as "rough diamonds, set to shine".

In parliament, he became a member of the Environment Select committee from 1990 until he was promoted to become an Opposition Whip by Tony Blair in 1995. However, he was sacked after the 1997 General Election and did not serve in government. He again joined the environment select committee (in its various guises of Environment, Transport and the Regions and Transport, Local Government and the Regions). He was a member of the Speaker's Panel of Chairmen from 2000 and served on the select committee of the Office of the Deputy Prime Minister from 2002.

On 9 October 2006, Cummings announced his intention to stand down at the next general election. In September 2007, the Easington Constituency Labour Party (CLP) selected local councillor and CLP secretary Grahame Morris as their candidate for the 2010 election.

Personal life
Unmarried and Roman Catholic, he died from lung cancer in January 2017 in Durham at the age of 73.

References

External links 
 The Labour Party - John Cummings MP official biography
 Guardian Unlimited Politics - Ask Aristotle: John Cummings MP
 TheyWorkForYou.com - John Cummings MP
 BBC Politics page

1943 births
2017 deaths
Labour Party (UK) MPs for English constituencies
National Union of Mineworkers-sponsored MPs
UK MPs 1987–1992
UK MPs 1992–1997
UK MPs 1997–2001
UK MPs 2001–2005
UK MPs 2005–2010
British Eurosceptics